Mu-Tron EP is the third extended play (EP) by English electronic band Ladytron. It was released in the United Kingdom in October 2000 by Invicta Hi-Fi Records on CD and 12" formats. The title "Mu-Tron" is a reference to the manufacturer of electronic musical effects with the same name. The cover has been designed by the band member Reuben Wu.

"Another Breakfast With You" and "Paco!" will be later included on Ladytron's debut album titled 604, while "USA vs. White Noise" and "Playgirl" (Snap Ant Version) will appear as bonus tracks to the same album. 604 also included an instrumental song titled "Mu-Tron".

Track listing
CD
"Another Breakfast With You"
"Paco!"
"USA vs. White Noise"
"Playgirl" (Snap Ant Version)

12"
A1. "USA vs. White Noise"
A2. "Playgirl" (Snap Ant Version)
B1. "Paco!"
B2. "Another Breakfast With You"

References

2000 EPs
Ladytron albums